Dihydrokainic acid is an organic compound that contains two carboxylic acid functional groups, making it a dicarboxylic acid.  It is an inhibitor of the GLT-1 glutamate transporter.

See also
 Kainic acid

References

Dicarboxylic acids
Isopropyl compounds
Pyrrolidines